Aces Go Places,, also known in the United States as Diamondfinger or Mad Mission, is a 1982 Hong Kong action comedy film directed by Eric Tsang, and starring Samuel Hui and Karl Maka.

It is the first installment in the Aces Go Places film series.

Plot
A suave, smooth burglar named King Kong tries to make up for his thieving ways by teaming up with an Albert 'Baldy' Au, a bumbling Taishanese police detective from the United States. Both work together to try to find a set of stolen diamonds; the diamonds are also being tracked by a European criminal known as 'White Gloves'. The two heroes are supervised by Superintendent Nancy Ho, who has a temper.

Cast
 Samuel Hui as King Kong
 Karl Maka as Albert Au
 Sylvia Chang as Supt. Nancy Ho
 Dean Shek as Gigolo Joe (special guest appearance)
 Tsui Hark as Ballerina Director (special guest appearance)
 Carroll Gordon as Ding Dong
 Chan Sing as Mad Max
 Anna Ng as Rose
 Lindzay Chan as Ballerina
 Veronica Lau as Mary
 Hon Kwok-choi as Squealie
 Sze Kai-keung as Laurel
 Cho Tat-wah as Uncle Wah
 Kam Piu as Szeto
 To Siu-ming as Tattoo artist
 Robert Houston as White Gloves
 Jimmy Shaw as Monterosso
 Andrew Miller as Antonio
 Glen Thompson as Governor at meeting
 Fung Ging Man as Snr. police officer at meeting
 Lee Pang-fei as Snr. police officer at meeting
 Ng Yan-chi as Snr. police officer at meeting
 Chik Ngai-hung as Rascal who gets fresh with Ho
 Shing Wan-on as Cheong
 Lai Kim-hung as Blubber mouth
 Tai San as Glove's thug
 Wong Chi-wai as Glove's thug attacking King Kong
 Cheung Kwok-wah as Mad Max's thug
 Chow Kam-kong as Mad Max's thug
 Pang Yun-cheung as Mad Max's thug
 Fung Yun-chuen as Diamond verifier
 Cheng Siu-ping as Councillor Chan in taxi 
 Raymond Wong as Priest in taxi (cameo)
 Yu Mo-lin as Nurse
 Ho Pak-kwong as Toilet Attendant
 George Lam as Ambulance driver (cameo)
 Man Ngai-tik as Snr. naval officer at meeting

Awards and nominations

See also
 Aces Go Places (film series)

References

External links
 Review from HKCuk.co.uk
 
 

Hong Kong New Wave films
1982 films
1980s action comedy films
1982 martial arts films
Hong Kong action comedy films
Hong Kong martial arts comedy films
Hong Kong slapstick comedy films
1980s parody films
Police detective films
Hong Kong heist films
1980s Cantonese-language films
Films set in Hong Kong
Films shot in Hong Kong
Films directed by Eric Tsang
Chinese New Year films
Hong Kong detective films
1982 comedy films
1980s Hong Kong films